The ash-throated casiornis (Casiornis fuscus) is a species of bird in the family Tyrannidae.
It is endemic to northeastern Brazil.

Its natural habitat is in subtropical or tropical dry forests.

References

ash-throated casiornis
Birds of Brazil
Birds of the Caatinga
Endemic birds of Brazil
ash-throated casiornis
ash-throated casiornis
ash-throated casiornis
Taxonomy articles created by Polbot